Vassline (Hangul: 바세린) is a metalcore band from South Korea that formed in 1996. Their 2004 album, Blood of Immortality, won the award for Best Rock Album at the 2005 Korean Music Awards.

Members
 Choi Hyeon-Jin – drums, percussion
 Kangto Lee – guitars
 Shin Woo-Seok – lead vocals
 Jo Min-Yeong – guitars, backing vocals
 Lee Gi-Ho – bass, backing vocals

Former
 Bak "Tiger Jin" Jin – guitars
 Top – guitars
 Dab Shib Rian – guitars
 Yoon Hong-Gu – drums, percussion

Discography
Studio albums
 The Portrait of Your Funeral (2002)
 Blood of Immortality (2004)
 Permanence (2007)
 Black Silence (2013)
 Memoirs of the War (2017)

EPs, demos, and splits
 Bloodthirsty (2000)
 Missing Link (2001)
 The Splitsphere (split w/ Myproof (JAPAN)) (2006)

Compilations
 Club "Hardcore" 1st Edition (1997)
 3000 Punk (1998)
 One Family Vol.1 (1999)

Awards

References

External links 
 Vassline on Discogs

South Korean rock music groups
Culture of Seoul
Metalcore musical groups
Post-hardcore groups
Musical groups established in 1996
Korean Music Award winners